Stephen Stepanovich Rachunok (a.k.a. "The Mad Russian") (December 5, 1916 – May 11, 2002), was a professional baseball pitcher in Major League Baseball for the Brooklyn Dodgers.

A native of in Rittman, Ohio, Rachunok appeared in two games during the 1940 season, one as a starter, where he pitched a complete game. His Major League Baseball (MLB) debut came on September 17, 1940, where he pitched the top of the ninth inning surrendering 1 walk while striking out 1 as the Dodgers were defeated 5–0 by the visiting St. Louis Cardinals at Ebbets Field. His only other MLB appearance came 9 days later in the second game of a doubleheader at Ebbets Field when facing the Boston Bees surrendering 5 runs (all earned), striking out 9, while walking 4, en route to a 5–4 loss.

Rachunok died on May 11, 2002 in Corona, California.

References

External links

Major League Baseball pitchers
Baseball players from Ohio
Brooklyn Dodgers players
People from Rittman, Ohio
People from Corona, California
1916 births
2002 deaths
Jackson Senators players
Beaumont Exporters players
Lake Charles Skippers players
Sioux City Cowboys players
Henderson Oilers players
Montreal Royals players
Indianapolis Indians players